Leandro Juan Hugo Mamut (born 31 December 2003) is an Argentine professional footballer who plays as an attacking midfielder for Gimnasia La Plata.

Career
Mamut began his career at the age of four with Club Las Malvinas, prior to his departure to Asociación Deportiva Anunciación de Fútbol Infantil (ADAFI) in 2013. Three years later, Mamut headed to Gimnasia y Esgrima. He signed his first professional contract on 27 January 2020; aged sixteen. Mamut, who'd appear non-competitively in the intervening period, made the jump into senior football just over twelve months later on 19 February 2021, as he appeared on the bench for a Copa de la Liga Profesional match against Talleres. His debut soon arrived, as he came on to replace Matías Miranda in stoppage time of a 3–0 win.

Personal life
Mamut comes from a family of amateur boxers, with him being the only one of eight siblings to choose football at a young age. His father died in a motorcycle accident on 11 March 2014.

Career statistics
.

Notes

References

External links

2003 births
Living people
People from La Plata Partido
Argentine footballers
Association football midfielders
Argentine Primera División players
Club de Gimnasia y Esgrima La Plata footballers
Sportspeople from Buenos Aires Province